Elisabeth Johanna Amelia Caland (13 January 1862 in Rotterdam − 26 January 1929 in Berlin) was a German pianist, piano teacher and theorist of piano technique of Dutch origin.

Life 

Caland was born in Rotterdam. She received her first education in Rotterdam. She first taught piano in Wiesbaden, since 1898 in Berlin and since 1915 in Gehlsdorf and Rostock. She represented Deppe's conception of piano playing by means of coordinated movement of the whole arm instead of an isolated finger movement that emerged from harpsichord playing. She advocated this way of playing, which was in confrontation with the usual way of playing at the time. She was the first to establish the conscious lowering of the shoulder blade as an art movement to develop the back muscles as a source of strength when playing the piano, which she taught practically. She also introduced the shaking movement from the shoulder into the methodology as a systematic basis for the execution of tremolo figures and trills. She wrote several books on piano technique, in which she described the "Deppe's method", as well as articles in the journal Musikpädagogische Blätter.

Caland died in Berlin at the age of 67.

Compositions 
 Die Deppe'sche Lehre des Klavierspiels, Ebner, Stuttgart 1897.
 Ludwig Deppe's Fünffingerübungen und sein mit Fingersatz und Pedalbrauch bezeichnetes Übungsmaterial, Ebner'sche Hof-Musikalienhandlung, Stuttgart 1899.
 Das künstlerische Klavierspiel in seinen physiologischen und physikalischen Vorgängen, Magdeburg 1910.
 Technische Ratschläge für Klavierspieler, Ebner, Stuttgart 1902 (new edition together with Die Deppe'sche Lehre des Klavierspiel, idem, 1912).
 Die Ausnützung der Kraftquellen beim Klavierspiel. Stuttgart 1905.
 Anhaltspunkte zur Kontrolle zweckmässiger Armbewegungen beim künstlerischen Klavierspiel, Magdeburg, Heinrichshofen 1919.
 Praktische Lehrgänge für künstlerisches Klavierspiel, Stuttgart 1921.
 Vorübungen zum schnellen Oktavenspiel für Deppes Fünffingerübungen, 1923.

Publications 
 Réforme pianistique : (système Deppe). (1899)
 Das künstlerische Klavierspiel in seinen physiologisch-physikalischen Vorgängen : nebst Versuch einer praktischen Anleitung zur Ausnützung seiner Kraftquellen. (1919)
 Die Deppe'sche Lehre des Klavierspiels.
 Artistic piano playing, as taught by Ludwig Deppe : together with Practical advice on questions of technique.

Literature 
Hugo Riemann: Caland, Elisabeth. In Musiklexikon, 11th edition, Max Hesses Verlag, Berlin 1929, . (Digitalisat.)

References

External links 

 

German classical pianists
Women classical pianists
German music educators
1862 births
1929 deaths
Musicians from Rotterdam